The Manatee County Public Library is a division of the Manatee County Community and Veterans Services Department in Manatee County, Florida, United States. It has six branches. The public library system provides patrons with books, genealogy resources, online resources, and outreach services. Patrons have access to e-books, e-audio, music, movies, and five databases through the Manatee County Public Library system. Library cards are free to those who reside, own property, attend school, or work in Manatee County.

Branches 
 Braden River Library, Bradenton
 Downtown Central Library, Bradenton
 Island Library, Holmes Beach
 Palmetto Library, Palmetto
 Rocky Bluff Library, Ellenton
 South Manatee Library, Bradenton

History 

In 1898, Julia Fuller carried book rentals in her store, which later moved to American Sudbury's store. A library committee was formed in 1904 by the Village Improvement Association. Dr. J.C. Pelot donated a lot at 12th St. West and Avenue West for the library to be built on. In 1904, T. J. Bachman loaned $500 to aid in the construction of a small library.

In 1914, $10,000 was given by the Carnegie Foundation to establish the first library in the area, Palmetto Carnegie Library.

In 1918 the County Library System was established with the opening of the Bradenton Carnegie Library, where the first bookmobile was started in 1956. That same year, some additions were added to the Bradenton Carnegie Library, increasing the overall square footage by one third.

In 1963, a plan was approved for a countywide system which allowed the cities of Bradenton and Palmetto to join with Manatee County. From 1966 to 1969, the South Manatee Branch Library and the Island Branch Library were built. In the early 1970s, the idea of a large central library was proposed by the county. On April 24, 1978, the Central Library was opened to county citizens.

In 1990, the library system decided to use the Online Computer Library Center (OCLC) to catalog books and other items. OCLC has become a vital part of the information infrastructure that supports research, scholarship, and learning around the world.

In 1992, a text-only computer was added to the libraries that was connected to the Bradenton Herald newspaper and had access to the index software. Two years later, one public computer was added for the use of word processing and educational software. In 1996, the first online catalog computers were added for the staff, which replaced the old large wooden card catalogs. Soon after, a few were added for patrons to use. 

In 2000, the Central Library gained twelve Windows-based PCs in the second-floor computer lab, thanks to a grant from the Bill and Melinda Gates Foundation. In 2001, bookmobiles were updated, but their services ended in 2010. 

Throughout the 2010s, other technology was brought to the library, such as iPads, PCs, laptops, e-readers, and Wifi systems to enhance patrons' experience. 

Beginning November 16, 2020, Manatee County Public Libraries went fine free.

Awards 
 2021: Foundations & Boards Outstanding Program Award - Florida Library Association for Friends of the Rocky Bluff Library's Storytelling Festival
 2021: Foundations & Boards Outstanding Member Award - Florida Library Association for Friends of the Central Library treasurer and bookstore manager Judy Wetter.
 2018: Innovation Award - Florida Library Association in recognition of 805 Lit + Art Journal, the first literary and art journal published by a library.
 2018: Libraries Mean Business - Florida Library Association for Information Services' beneficial service to local businesses and job seekers
 2017: Librarian of the Year (Florida Library Association) - Ava Ehde, Library Services Manager
 2017: Friends, Foundation & Board Award (Florida Library Association) - Friends of the Rocky Bluff Library's Biannual Newsletter
 2016: Library of the Year - Florida Library Association, in recognition of the Manatee County Public Library System for the outstanding service it provides to the community

References

External links
 https://www.mymanatee.org/home/government/departments/neighborhood-services/library.html
 http://www.manateecountyhistoricalsociety.com/

Public libraries in Florida
Manatee County, Florida
1918 establishments in Florida
Libraries established in 1918